The 2006 congressional elections in Oklahoma were held on November 7, 2006 to determine who would represent the state of Oklahoma in the United States House of Representatives. Oklahoma has five seats in the House, apportioned according to the 2000 United States census. Representatives are elected for two-year terms; those elected served in the 110th Congress from January 4, 2009 until January 3, 2011.

Overview

District 1

Seeking a fourth term in Congress, incumbent Republican Congressman John Sullivan faced no difficulty against Democratic nominee Alan Gentges and independent Bill Wortman in this staunchly conservative district based in the Tulsa metropolitan area.

Republican primary

Candidates

Nominee 

 John A. Sullivan, incumbent U.S. representative.

Eliminated in primary 

 Evelyn L. Rogers, librarian and perennial candidate.
 Fran Moghaddam, entrepreneur.

Primary results

Democratic primary

Candidates

Nominee 

 Alan Gentges, attorney.

Independent and third-party candidates

Independents

Declared 

 Bill Wortman, mechanical engineer.

General election

Results

District 2

Incumbent Democratic Congressman Dan Boren, the son of former Governor and U.S. Senator David Boren, easily dispatched with his Republican opponent, Patrick Miller, in this district based in eastern Oklahoma, or "Little Dixie." This district, strongly conservative at the national level, tends to favor Democrats at the local level.

Republican primary

Candidates

Nominee 

 Patrick K. Miller, perennial candidate.

Eliminated in primary 

 Raymond J. Wickson, journalist with Tulsa World.

Primary results

Democratic primary

Nominee 

 Dan Boren, incumbent U.S. representative.

General election

Results

District 3

Incumbent Republican Congressman Frank Lucas sought and won an eighth term in Congress from this district, the most conservative district in Oklahoma and the eleventh-most conservative district nationwide.

Republican primary

Candidates

Nominee 

 Frank Lucas, incumbent U.S. representative.

Democratic primary

Candidates

Nominee 

 Sue Barton, non-profit administrator.

Eliminated in primary 

 John Coffee Harris, attorney.
 Gregory M. Wilson, Carney, Oklahoma police and fire chief.

Primary results

General election

Results

District 4

In this conservative district, based in south-central Oklahoma, incumbent Republican Congressman Tom Cole easily defeated Democratic opponent Hal Spake to win a third term.

Republican primary

Candidates

Nominee 

 Tom Cole, incumbent U.S. representative.

Democratic primary

Candidates

Nominee 

 Hal Spake, retired foreign service officer.

General election

Results

District 5

Incumbent Republican Congressman Ernest Istook declined to seek an eighth term in Congress, instead opting to run for Governor, creating an open seat. Mary Fallin, the Lieutenant Governor of Oklahoma, won the Republican primary and was favored to win the general election in this largely conservative district based in the Oklahoma City metropolitan area. Though Fallin was victorious on election day, her margin of victory over Democratic opponent David Hunter was the thinnest margin of any member of the Oklahoma congressional delegation.

Republican primary

Candidates

Nominee 

 Mary Fallin, Lieutenant Governor of Oklahoma.

Eliminated in primary 

 Mick Cornett, mayor of Oklahoma City.
 Denise Bode, Oklahoma Corporation Commissioner.
 Kevin Calvey, member of the Oklahoma House of Representatives.
 Fred Morgan, member of the Oklahoma House of Representatives.
 Johnny B. Roy, physician.

Primary results

Democratic primary

Candidates

Nominee 

 David Hunter, physician.

Eliminated in primary 

 Bert Smith, secondary school math teacher.

Primary results

Independent and third-party candidates

Independents 

 Matthew Horton Woodson, kayak instructor.

General election

Results

References

See also
 Oklahoma Congressional Districts
 Politics of Oklahoma
 Oklahoma Democratic Party
 Oklahoma Republican Party
 2006 United States House of Representatives elections
 2006 Oklahoma state elections

Okla

2006
United States House